Ban Ban is a rural locality in the North Burnett Region, Queensland, Australia.

Geography
The locality of Ban Ban completely surrounds the locality of Ban Ban Springs which is situated at the intersection of the Burnett Highway and Isis Highway. As such, both highways also cross Ban Ban as it surrounds the intersection.

It is part of the Walla Range, which extends north into Ginoondan and Coalstoun Lakes..

History 

Economy 
There are a number of homesteads in the locality:

 Ban Ban
 Hazelton
 Jenreley

Education 
There are no schools in Ban Ban. The nearest government primary schools are Coalstoun Lakes State School in neighbouring Coalstoun Lakes to the north-east and Gayndah State School in Gayndah to the north-west. The nearest government secondary schools are Biggenden State School (to Year 10) in Biggenden to the north-east and Burnett State College (to Year 12) in Gayndah.

References

Localities in Queensland
North Burnett Region